HMS Lynn was a 32-gun fifth rate built under contract by Thomas Ellis of Shoreham in 1695/96. She spent her entire career on trade protection and anti-piracy patrols. Her service was in Home Waters North America, the West Indies and the East Indies. She was sold in 1713.

She was the first vessel to bear the name Lynn in the English and Royal Navy.

Construction and Specifications
She was ordered on 16 February 1694 to be built under contract by Mr. Flint of Plymouth. She was launched on 20 April 1695. Her builder’s measure tonnage was calculated as 384 tons (burthen).

The gun armament initially was four demi-culverins on the lower deck (LD) with two pair of guns per side. The upper deck (UD) battery would consist of between twenty and twenty-two 6-pounder guns with ten or eleven guns per side. The gun battery would be completed by four 4-pounder guns on the quarterdeck (QD) with two to three guns per side.

Commissioned Service 1696-1712
HMS Lynn was commissioned in 1696 under the command of Captain Horatio Townsend for service in Irish Waters in 1697. In 1698 she went to the West Indies where Captain Townsend died on 12 March 1699. Captain Edmund Letchmere took command following his death on 16 March 1699 and was assigned to Sir George Rooke's Fleet. Captain Letchmere was reappointed on 9 July 1700 then again on 26 May 1701. Captain John Watkins was in command in 1702. Between 1704 and 1705 Captain George Martin was in Command in the Leeward Islands. On 16 July 1706 Captain Sir George Forbes, the Earl of Grannard was assigned command. Captain Archibald Hamilton was in command at Barbados on 12 January 1707. On 28 February 1709 she was assigned Captain Henry Blinston as her commander for service in the Mediterranean. She sailed with Baker's squadron on the Portuguese coast in 1712.

Disposition
She was sold to Francis Sheldon for £195 on 16 April 1713.

Notes

Citations

References

 Winfield (2009), British Warships in the Age of Sail (1603 – 1714), by Rif Winfield, published by Seaforth Publishing, England © 2009, EPUB 
 Colledge (2020), Ships of the Royal Navy, by J.J. Colledge, revised and updated by Lt Cdr Ben Warlow and Steve Bush, published by Seaforth Publishing, Barnsley, Great Britain, © 2020, EPUB 
 Lavery (1989), The Arming and Fitting of English Ships of War 1600 - 1815, by Brian Lavery, published by US Naval Institute Press © Brian Lavery 1989, Part V Guns, Type of Guns
 Clowes (1898), The Royal Navy, A History from the Earliest Times to the Present (Vol. II). London. England: Sampson Low, Marston & Company, © 1898
 Clowes (1898), The Royal Navy, A History from the Earliest Times to the Present (Vol. III). London. England: Sampson Low, Marston & Company, © 1898

 

Frigates of the Royal Navy
Ships of the Royal Navy
1690s ships